Linda Dement (born 1960 in Brisbane) is an Australian multidisciplinary artist, working in the fields of digital arts, photography, film, and writing non-fiction. Dement is largely known for her exploration of the creative possibilities of emergent technologies such as the CD-ROM, 3-D modelling, interactive software, and early computing.

About 
She began exhibiting in 1984. She graduated with a Bachelor of Arts (Fine Arts) from City Art Institute, Sydney in 1988.

Dement's work has been exhibited in Australia and internationally in galleries and festivals, including at the Institute of Contemporary Art in London, Ars Electronica in Austria, the International Symposia of Electronic Art in Sydney and Montreal and the Impakt Media Arts Festival in Europe.

Along with Australian artist collective VNS Matrix, Dement's work pioneered Australian cyberfeminism in art. Cyberfeminist politics and poetics used technology to deconstruct gender stereotypes in mainstream culture, and proactively situated women in relation to the rise of electronic culture in the early 1990s. Through her work, Dement aims to "give form to the unbearable." Dement's work has been described as depersonalised autobiography, that is, an appropriation of the digital as a space of expression, or a "rupture" in the info-tech dominated sphere of computer culture. Her work explores the relationship between the physical body and the body politic, exaggerating female "other-ness" or the "monstrous-feminine."

Censorship
Some of Dement's early works have come under censorship by the Australian Government. Typhoid Mary was taken to the NSW Parliament as being "obscene" and subsequently came under the classification of the Australian Government's Office of Film and Literature as "not suitable for those under the age of 18."  In My Gash also received a formal "Restricted" classification.

Works

Writing
Artists Thinking About Science (with Helen Watson-Verran et al.). Adelaide, S.A.: Australian Network for Art and Technology, 1994.
I Really Want to Kill You But I Can't Remember Why (with Jasmine Hirst et al.). Woolloomooloo, NSW: Artspace Australia, 1995.
"Girl #4 Late 70s," in Peter Blazey et al. (eds.), Love Cries. Sydney: Angus and Robertson, 1995
"Payment," in Leonie Stevens (ed.), Warp Drive. Milsons Point, NSW: Random House, 1998
Byte Me: art + culture + technology (with Kevin Murray et al.). Bendigo, Vic.: Bendigo Art Gallery, 1999

Awards and Prizes
Dement was twice awarded the Harries Australian National Digital Art Award in 2005 and 2006, was awarded a New Media Arts Fellowship in 1996 and the Digital Futures Fund in 2010 by the Australia Council for the Arts, Best CD-ROM at the 9th Stuttgarter Filmwinter Festival in Germany; and Honorable Mentions by New Voices/New Visions, Palo Alto, California; and Ars Electronica, Austria.

References

External links
 Official website
 Linda Dement | AVAA
 Linda Dement | Scanlines

1960 births
Living people
20th-century Australian women artists
20th-century Australian artists
21st-century Australian women artists
21st-century Australian artists
Australian digital artists
Women digital artists
New media artists